Appointment with Murder is a 1948 American crime film directed by Jack Bernhard and starring John Calvert, Catherine Craig and Jack Reitzen. The film is one of three made by the low-budget Film Classics company featuring Calvert as The Falcon who had previously been played by George Sanders and Tom Conway for RKO.

Premise
The Falcon travels to Milan to locate some stolen paintings for an insurance company. He follows the trail from a murdered Italian painter to an art gallery in Los Angeles.

Cast
 John Calvert as Michael Waring, the Falcon 
 Catherine Craig as Lorraine W. Brinckley 
 Jack Reitzen as Norton Benedict 
 Lyle Talbot as Fred Muller 
 Peter Brocco as Giuseppe Donatti 
 Ben Welden as Martin Minecci 
 Robert Conte as Count Dano 
 Jay Griffith as Detective 
 Michael Mark as 2nd Baggage Clerk 
 Carlo Schipa as Mario Farello 
 Anna Demetrio as Senora Rosa - Italian Woman
 Carole Donne as Miss Connors 
 Barbara Freking as Barbara O'Brien - The Model
 Jack Chefe as Johnny - Hotel Clerk 
 Eugene Gericke as 1st Thug 
 James Griffith as Detective
 Pat Lane as Customs Officer
 Robert Nadell as 1st Baggage Clerk 
 Frank Richards as 2nd Thug 
 Carl Sklover as Guard 
 Eric Wilton as Count Dano's Butler

References

Bibliography
 Hardy, Phil. The BFI Companion to Crime. University of California Press, 1997.

External links
 
 
 
 

1948 films
American crime films
1948 crime films
Films directed by Jack Bernhard
Film Classics films
Films set in Los Angeles
Films set in Milan
American black-and-white films
The Falcon (film character) films
Films scored by Karl Hajos
1940s English-language films
1940s American films